The Lexington Avenue explosion was the July 4, 1914, explosion of a terrorist bomb in an apartment at 1626 Lexington Avenue in New York City. Members of the Lettish section of the Anarchist Black Cross (ABC) were constructing a bomb in a seven-story tenement when the group's large supply of dynamite exploded prematurely. The blast destroyed most of the top three floors of the building, killing three conspirators and another renter who was not part of the bomb plot, as well as injuring dozens more.

The conspirators
In July 1914, two members of the Lettish section of the Anarchist Red Cross (ARC), Charles Berg and Carl Hanson, began collecting dynamite they had obtained from Russia. Plotting with them was Industrial Workers of the World (IWW) member Arthur Caron. They stored the dynamite at the apartment of another ARC member, Louise Berger, who was an editor of Emma Goldman's Mother Earth magazine. Several meetings were held at the Ferrer Center, where the group devised a plan in which Caron, Berg, and Hanson were to plant a bomb at John D. Rockefeller's home in Tarrytown, New York.

According to later accounts, the three men, along with Alexander Berkman and Charles Robert Plunkett, met at the Ferrer Center at least twice to discuss the plot. Plunkett, a party to the conspiracy, later stated that Berkman chose to remain behind the scenes rather than take an active role in the bombing due to his being on probation for the attempted murder of Henry Clay Frick. Berkman later denied any involvement or knowledge of the plan, a denial supported by some who knew him, and rejected by others. Plunkett also claimed that neither Rockefeller nor his house were intended to be the target of the bomb, and that its detonation in Tarrytown would be merely a "gesture of protest."

Explosion
At 9 a.m. on July 4, Berger left her tenement building at 1626 Lexington Avenue and went to the Mother Earth offices on 119th Street. Fifteen minutes later, a deadly explosion took place on the sixth story of the Lexington Avenue building, located between 102nd and  103rd Streets in the thickly populated area of Harlem, only a few blocks away from the Ferrer Center. Passers-by witnessed a shower of debris and rubble fall into the street. The three upper floors of the tenement building were destroyed by the explosion, while debris showered rooftops and the streets below. Large pieces of furniture were thrown hundreds of feet through the air due to the power of the blast. 

The bomb intended for Rockefeller had exploded prematurely inside Berger's apartment, killing Hanson, Berg, Caron and Marie Chavez, who had apparently not been involved in the conspiracy but had merely rented a room in the apartment. The blast threw Caron's body onto the mangled and twisted fire escape. The mutilated bodies of Chavez and Hanson were found inside the apartment. The blast had torn the body of Berg into pieces, which were seen by spectators being thrown through the air onto the streets. In total, twenty other people were injured, seven of them severely enough to be hospitalized. Berkman attended the men's funerals. Berger later denied any involvement, and police were unable to implicate her in the conspiracy.

Another IWW member named "Mike" Murphy was spending the night in the same apartment when the explosion occurred. The blast destroyed the floor underneath him, causing his bed to fall into the apartment below. Slightly dazed and confused, Murphy was able to walk away from the incident with only the loss of some clothes and a few minor bruises. He was immediately sought for questioning by the police but was able to slip away to Mother Earth headquarters, where it is believed that Berkman sent him into hiding, accompanied by fellow co-conspirator Plunkett. Murphy was first taken to New Jersey, then to Philadelphia by members of the Radical Library, and finally on to Canada.

Aftermath
The deaths of the bomb makers did not end the attacks against Rockefeller and his company, Standard Oil. On November 19, 1915, another bomb plot was discovered, this time against John D. Archbold, President of Standard Oil, at his home in Tarrytown. Police theorized the bomb was planted by anarchists and IWW radicals as a protest against the execution of IWW member Joe Hill in Salt Lake City, Utah. The bomb was discovered by a gardener who found four sticks of dynamite, weighing  each, half hidden in a rut in a driveway  from the front entrance of the residence. The dynamite sticks were bound together by a length of wire, fitted with percussion caps, and wrapped with a piece of paper matching the color of the driveway, a path used by Archbold in going to or from his home by automobile. The bomb was later defused by police.

Gallery

See also

 Greenwich Village townhouse explosion 
Domestic terrorism in the United States
Anarchism and violence
Propaganda of the deed
 September 1920 Wall Street bombing
Palmer Raids
Espionage Act of 1917
1919 United States anarchist bombings
Milwaukee Police Department bombing

Bibliography
Notes

References
 - Total pages: 265 
 - Total pages: 323

Further reading
  - Total pages: 214 
  - Total pages: 416  
 

 
Explosions in 1914
1914 in New York City
1910s in Manhattan
Building bombings in the United States
Terrorist incidents in the 1910s
Terrorist incidents in New York City
East Harlem
Failed assassination attempts in the United States
Mass murder in New York (state)
Mass murder in New York City
1914 disasters in the United States
July 1914 events
Lexington Avenue
Mass murder in the United States
Mass murder in 1914
1914 murders in the United States
Crimes in Manhattan
Murder in New York City